Vasile Puşcaş (b. Surduc, July 8, 1952) is a Romanian politician, diplomat and International Relations professor.

Biography 
During 2000–2004 he was the Romanian Chief Negotiator with the European Union, and he is considered by many "responsible" for Romania's accession to the EU.
A member of the Romanian Chamber of Deputies from 2000 to 2008, he belongs to the Social Democratic Party (PSD).

Works 
România spre Uniunea Europeană. Negocierile de aderare (2000–2004), Iaşi: Institutul European, 2007
România şi iar România. Note pentru o istorie prezentă, Cluj-Napoca: Eikon, 2007
European Negotiations. A Case Study: The Romania's Accession to EU. Gorizia, IUIES, 2006
“Sticks and Carrots”. Regranting the Most-Favored-Nation Status for Romania (US Congress, 1990–1996) / “Bastoane şi Morcovi”, Reacordarea clauzei naţiunii celei mai favorizate (Congresul SUA, 1990–1996), Cluj-Napoca: Eikon, 2006
Relaţii internaţionale/transnaţionale, Cluj-Napoca: Sincron, 2005
Negociind cu Uniunea Europeană, 6 volume, ed. Economică, București, 2003:
vol. I  - „Documente iniţiale de poziţie la capitolele de negociere” (2003)
vol. II – „Initial Position Documents”  (2003)
vol. III – „Preparing the External Environment of Negotiations” (2003)
vol.  IV – „Pregătirea mediului intern de negociere” (2003)
vol. V – „Pregătirea mediului de negociere, 2003–2004” (2005)
vol. VI – „Comunicarea publică şi negocierea pentru aderare, 2003–2004” (2005)

Universitate-Societate-Modernizare, Presa Univ. Clujeană, Cluj-Napoca, 1995; Ediţia a II-a, 2003
Speranţă şi disperare - Negocieri româno-aliate, 1943–1944, București, Ed.Litera, 1995; Ediţia a II-a, 2003
Relaţii internaţionale contemporane, Cluj-Napoca, Sincron, 1999; Ediţia a II-a, 2003
Căderea României în Balcani, Cluj-Napoca, Dacia, 2000
Pulsul istoriei în Europa Centrală, Cluj-Napoca, Sincron, 1998
Transilvania si aranjamentele europene. 1940–1944, Cluj-Napoca, Ed.FCR, 1995
Alma Mater Napocensis – Idealul universităţii moderne, Cluj-Napoca, Ed. FCR 1994
Dr. Petru Groza – pentru o "lume nouă", Editura Dacia, 1985 (a fost interzisă şi arsă întreaga ediţie)

References

External links
 Biography 

1952 births
Living people
Members of the Chamber of Deputies (Romania)
Social Democratic Party (Romania) politicians
Romanian political scientists
Romanian academics
People from Sălaj County
Romanian essayists
Babeș-Bolyai University alumni
Romanian biographers
Romanian male writers
Male biographers
Romanian textbook writers
20th-century Romanian historians
21st-century Romanian historians
Romanian journalists
Romanian memoirists
Romanian science writers
Romanian civil servants
Male essayists